The recapitulation theory of the atonement is a doctrine in Christian theology related to the meaning and effect of the death of Jesus Christ.

While it is sometimes absent from summaries of atonement theories, more comprehensive overviews of the history of the atonement doctrine typically include a section about the “recapitulation” view of the atonement, which was first clearly formulated by Irenaeus of Lyons.

One of the main New Testament scriptures upon which this view is based states: "[God's purpose is, in] the fulness of the times, to sum up all things in Christ, the things in the heavens, and the things upon the earth..." (Ephesians 1:10, RV). The Greek word for 'sum up' (ἀνακεφαλαιώσασθαι, anakephalaiosasthai) was literally rendered 'to recapitulate' in Latin.

In the recapitulation view of the atonement, Christ is seen as the new Adam who succeeds where Adam failed. Christ undoes the wrong that Adam did and, because of his union with humanity, leads humankind on to eternal life (including moral perfection).

History
As highlighted above, Irenaeus is considered to be the first to clearly express a recapitulation view of the atonement, although he is anticipated by Justin Martyr, whom Irenaeus quotes in Against Heresies 4.6.2:

There follows two representative quotes from Irenaeus:

For Irenaeus, the ultimate goal of Christ's work of solidarity with humankind is to make humankind divine. Of Jesus he says, he 'became what we are, that He might bring us to be even what He is Himself'. This idea has been most influential in the Eastern Christianity, particularly within the Eastern Orthodox Church, having been taken on by many other Church Fathers, such as Ss. Athanasius, Gregory of Nazianzus, Augustine, and Maximus the Confessor. This Eastern Orthodox theological development out of the recapitulation view of the atonement is called theosis ("deification").

A more contemporary, slightly differing expression of the recapitulation view can be seen in D. E. H. Whiteley's reading of Paul the Apostle's theology. Whiteley favourably quotes Irenaeus' notion that Christ 'became what we are, that He might bring us to be even what He is Himself', although he never describes Paul's view of the atonement as a recapitulation; rather, he uses the word 'participation':

References

Atonement in Christianity
Christian terminology
Catholic theology and doctrine